Exoletuncus lobopus is a species of moth of the family Tortricidae that is endemic to Goiás, Brazil.

The ground colour of the forewings is white with black markings. The hindwings are whitish, suffused with grey and spotted from before the middle.

References

External links

Moths described in 2002
Endemic fauna of Brazil
Euliini
Moths of South America
Taxa named by Józef Razowski